Tad Hilgenbrink (born Tad Davie Hilgenbrinck Quintana, October 9, 1981) is an American actor, known for his role as Matt Stifler in American Pie Presents: Band Camp, Chance Marquis in The Curiosity of Chance and Tyler in The Hills Run Red.

Early life and career
Hilgenbrinck was born in Quincy, Illinois, and attended Quincy Senior High School, where he was actively involved in music and theater. He performed as part of the resident company for summer 2003 at Music Theatre of Wichita in Wichita, Kansas, where he performed in the musicals Footloose, Oklahoma!, Good News, Chicago, and The Scarlet Pimpernel. He has a BFA in musical theatre and a minor in dance from Millikin University and IES London. While at Millikin he spent his summers at the Little Theatre on the Square in Sullivan, Illinois, as a performing intern.

Later career
He has performed in roles such as the Artful Dodger in Oliver!, Gideon in Seven Brides for Seven Brothers, and Chuck Cranston in Footloose. He polished his creative craft, studying Shakespeare intensively in London and has starred in multiple theatrical pieces including A Midsummer Night's Dream, Chicago, and Oliver!. After many successful performances in New York and London, he ventured to Los Angeles giving himself only two weeks to make it or go home. After winning his first major roles as well as the Showcase on The Price Is Right, he decided to stay.

He was chosen for Matt Stifler due to his resemblance to Seann William Scott, replacing Eli Marienthal who portrayed the character in the primary American Pie series. He also appeared in the 2006 film The Curiosity of Chance, a movie in which he stars as a gay high school student who moved to a new school and must learn to fit in.

Filmography

References

External links

1981 births
Living people
American male television actors
American male film actors
American male stage actors
American male actors of Mexican descent
Contestants on American game shows
Male actors from Illinois
Actors from Quincy, Illinois
21st-century American male actors